Wolfgang Kubin (born December 17, 1945 in Celle) is a German poet, essayist,  sinologist and translator of literary works. He is the former director of the Institute for Oriental and Asian Studies at the University of Bonn, Germany. Kubin has frequently been a guest professor at universities in China, for instance at Beijing Foreign Studies University, but also in Madison, Wisconsin and in Jerusalem. Since 1989, Kubin has been the editor of the journals ORIENTIERUNGEN: Zeitschrift zur Kultur Asiens and Minima sinica: Zeitschrift zum chinesischen Geist.

Biography 

Having graduated from the Gymnasium Dionysianum in Rheine in 1965 (which provided him with a solid foundation in Classical Latin and Greek), Wolfgang Kubin studied Protestant theology at the University of Münster from 1966 until 1968. In 1968, he studied Japanology and Classical Chinese at the University of Vienna and from 1969 until 1973, sinology, philosophy, and German literature at the Ruhr University Bochum, Germany. He also engaged again in Japanese studies during these years. His doctoral dissertation focused on the lyrical works of the Tang dynasty poet Du Mu (803–852).

Kubin lectured at the Institute of East Asian Studies of the Free University of Berlin since 1977. He taught 20th century Chinese literature and art, and completed his postdoctoral thesis on the evolution of the concept of nature in Classical Chinese literature.

On October 1, 1985 Kubin became Professor of Chinese (Professor für Chinesisch (C3)) at the Institute for Oriental and Asian Studies at the University of Bonn; in 1989 he became Professor of Modern Sinology and in August 1995 he succeeded Rolf Trauzettel as Professor of Classical Sinology in Bonn.

Wolfgang Kubin became widely known among the general public as a translator of modern Chinese poetry and prose. His best known work is the translation of short stories and essays by Lu Xun. His History of Chinese Literature in the 20th  Century (published in German as Geschichte der chinesischen Literatur im 20. Jahrhundert) is considered as indispensable and a Classic.

2006 Deutsche Welle interview

In November 2006, Wolfgang Kubin made headlines when he commented on fairly recently published Chinese literature during an interview he gave to the German broadcaster Deutsche Welle. He denounced several works in harsh terms, referring to Wei Hui's Shanghai Baby as "garbage" and Jiang Rong's Wolf Totem as "fascist". Kubin has expressed his admiration for Lu Xun, and he has said that no contemporary author could compare to him.

Selected bibliography

Monographs and translations 
 . Frankfurt am Main (Suhrkamp) 1985, .
 . Bonn (Bouvier Verlag) 1989. – .
 . Bonn (Weidle) 2000, . – Poems.
 . Bonn (Weidle) 2002, . – Poems.
 . Bonn (Weidle) 2004, . – Poems.
 . With an epilogue by Heinz Ludwig Arnold. Vienna (Edition Milo Band 4. Lehner) 2006, . – Prose fiction.
 . Bonn (Weidle) 2009, . – Poems.
 . Bonn (Weidle) 2009, . – Poems.
 Wolfgang Kubin (ed.):  (History of Chinese Literature)
 Vol. 1: Wolfgang Kubin: . Munich (Saur) 2002, .
 Vol. 2: Thomas Zimmer: . Munich (Saur) 2002, .
 Vol. 3: Monika Motsch: .  Munich (Saur) 2003, .
 Vol. 4: Marion Eggert, Wolfgang Kubin, Rolf Trauzettel, Thomas Zimmer: . Munich (Saur) 2003, .
 Vol. 5: Karl-Heinz Pohl: . Munich (Saur) 2006, .
 Vol. 6: Wolfgang Kubin: . Munich (Saur) 2009, .
 Vol. 7: Wolfgang Kubin: . Munich (Saur) 2005, .
 Band 8: Lutz Bieg: . Munich (De Gruyter Saur) 2012, .
 Band 9: Marc Hermann, Weiping Huang, Henriette Pleiger, Thomas Zimmer: . Munich (De Gruyter Saur) 2010, .
 Band 10: Nicola Dischert: Register.  Munich (De Gruyter Saur) 2012, .
 Bei Dao:  translated and with a postscript by W. Kubin. Munich (Carl Hanser Verlag) 2009, .
 Marc Hermann, Wolfgang Kubin, Thomas Zimmer, Zhang Jie, Lena Henningsen, Shelley W. Chan, Anne Xu-Cobb:  Munich (edition global) 2009, .

Articles and interviews 

 Wolfgang Kubin: “To Translate is to Ferry Across:  Wu Li's 吳歷 (1632–1718) COLLECTION FROM SAO PAOLO,” in: Michael Lackner and Natascha Vittinghoff  (ed.) Mapping Meanings: The Field of New Learning in Late Qing China. Leiden (Brill) 2004, pp. 579 ff. – .
 Wolfgang Kubin, “Living with the Holocaust” in: At Home in Many Worlds: Reading, Writing and Translating from Chinese and Jewish Cultures. Essays in Honour of Irene Eber. (Veröffentlichungen des Ostasien-Instituts der Ruhr-Universität Bochum, 56), edited by Raoul David Findeisen, Gad C. Isay, Amira Katz-Goehr, Yuri Pines and Lihi Yariv-Laor. Wiesbaden (Harrassowitz Verlag)  2009, pp. 19–27. – .
 Wolfgang Kubin, “The Myriad Things: Random Thoughts on Nature in China and the West,” in: Hans Ulrich Vogel and Günter Dux (eds.),  Concepts of Nature: A Chinese-European Cross-Cultural Perspective. With an overview and introduction by Mark Elvin. Leiden (Brill) 2010, pp. 516–525. – .
 Der Übersetzer „in Klammern“ Deutsch-Chinesisches Kulturnetz, September 2009.
 Reflecting on Chinese literature. CCTV-9, 7. November 2010.
 Píng Xīn 平心 (Interview): 德国汉学权威另一只眼看现当代中国文学 Déguó Hànxué Quánwēi Lìngyīzhī Yǎn Kàn Xiàn-Dāngdài Zhōngguó Wénxué Deutsche Welle, 26. November 2006.

Honors 
Kubin received Friendship Award (China) in 2016. He also received the Pamir International Poetry Prize (帕米尔国际诗歌奖 Pàmǐěr Guójì Shīgē Jiǎng) which is taken to be the top literary prize awarded in the Chinese-speaking world. In 2013, the Deutsche Akademie für Sprache und Dichtung (German Academy for Language and Literature) awarded him the Johann Heinrich Voß Prize in Translation in recognition of his achievement as a literary translator.

References

External links 
 
Verband deutscher Schriftsteller (German writers'union)
 Mark Siemons: Chinas Staatsfernsehen: Beim Markt hört der Spaß auf. Frankfurter Allgemeine Zeitung, 4. Dezember 2010.
 Interview with Wolfgang Kubin:  Fall Ai Weiwei: "Das Schwarz-Weiß-Denken muss ein Ende haben"; zeit.online, 26. April 2011
 Wolfgang Kubin in: NRW Literatur im Netz 

German sinologists
People from Celle
1945 births
Living people
Chinese–German translators
German male non-fiction writers
German translators
University of Münster alumni
University of Vienna alumni
Ruhr University Bochum alumni
Academic staff of the Free University of Berlin
Academic staff of the University of Bonn